Fergus James Riordan is a Scottish/Irish actor and photographer, best known for his role in Ghost Rider: Spirit of Vengeance as Daniel "Danny" Ketch. He was born in Madrid, and one of his parents is Irish and the other is Scottish.

Career
At the age of 7 he accompanied his mother, her friend, and her friend's son to a casting audition. His acting career started to take form with the part of Richard in Fragile. Later he landed a major role in I Want to Be a Soldier, a supporting role in El sueño de Iván and then a main role in Ghost Rider: Spirit of Vengeance portraying Daniel "Danny" Ketch, a teenage boy that is the son of the devil.

Personal life 
Riordan studied photography at Leeds Arts University. He has a brother, Thomas.

Filmography

Films

Television

External links
 
 
 https://web.archive.org/web/20130122152454/http://www.thespiritofvengeance.com/site/ 
 https://web.archive.org/web/20120711072829/http://twitter.com/fergusriordan

References

1997 births
Living people
Scottish male film actors
Scottish male child actors
Scottish male television actors